Abu Al Hassan El-Shazly or Sheikh Shazlyas called now or the original name Humaithara (also spelled "Humaisara," "Al Maithara")  or Sheikh Shazily (Arabic. الشيخ الشاذلى) (as it is called in Egypt now) is an isolated town in the Egyptian desert located in the Red Sea Governorate in Egypt. The town is surrounded by hills. The Holy Shrine of Imām Nūr al-Dīn Abū al-Ḥasan ʻAlī al-Shādhilī is located here.

The shrine of Imam Shadhili 

Humaithara is well known in the Islamic pilgrimage map for the highly venerated tomb of Imam Shadhili. It takes around 3 hours by road from Aswan, 4–5 hours from Edfu.

The core tomb 
The core tomb building in which Imam Shadhili's grave is found was constructed in the year 1259 (656 Hijri), immediately after the death of Imam Shadhili.

The extended building 
After the late 13th century, the number of pilgrims visiting the grave of Imam Shadhili increased and the shrine was extended in order to accommodate large numbers of people. The visitors to this shrine include Imam Fassi of Makkah, who is also called the second al-Shadhili and one of his important disciples, his 21st khalifah, and the founder of the Fassiya branch of the Shadhili order. Almost all leaders (shuyūkh) from Bait Al Fassi, Makkah have visited the shrine of Imam Shadhili, their shaykh here in Humaithara.

The well of Humaithara 
There is a well outside the shrine. Imam Shadhili's gargled water was poured into this well on the day before his death. The water in this well is located in the midst of a desert but never goes dry throughout the year. The water of this well is pure and it serves the drinking water needs of the local villages.

Transport 
The airports closer to Humaithara are Marsa Alam Airport and Aswan International Airport. Bus services are available from Cairo, Aswan, and Marsa Alam. Taxi and rickshaw services are not available in the locality of Humaithara.

Climate 
Humaithara is one of Egypt's driest and hottest localities.

See also 
 Abul Hasan ash-Shadhili
 Abul Abbas al-Mursi
 Al-Busiri
 Ibn Ata Allah
 Al-Fassi family

References 

Populated places in Red Sea Governorate
Sufi shrines
Sufism in Egypt
Mausoleums in Egypt
Ziyarat